The 2017–18 South Alabama Jaguars men's basketball team represented the University of South Alabama during the 2017–18 NCAA Division I men's basketball season. The Jaguars were led by fifth-year head coach Matthew Graves and played their home games at the Mitchell Center in Mobile, Alabama as members in the Sun Belt Conference. They finished the season 14–18, 7–11 in Sun Belt play to finish in a tie for ninth place. They lost in the first round of the Sun Belt tournament to Troy.

On March 8, South Alabama fired head coach Matthew Graves. He finished at South Alabama with a five-year record of 65–96.

On March 15, South Alabama hired Nicholls State head coach Richie Riley as their new head coach.

Previous season
The Jaguars finished the 2016–17 season 14–18, 7–11 in Sun Belt play to finish in ninth place. They lost to Coastal Carolina in the first round of the Sun Belt tournament.

Off-season

Departures

Incoming transfers

Incoming recruits

Roster

Schedule and results

|-
!colspan=9 style=| Exhibition

|-
!colspan=9 style=| Regular season

|-
!colspan=9 style=| Sun Belt tournament

See also
 2017–18 South Alabama Jaguars women's basketball team

References

2017-18
2017–18 Sun Belt Conference men's basketball season
2017 in sports in Alabama
2018 in sports in Alabama